The Messaging Open Service Interface Definition (OSID) is an O.K.I. specification which provided a means of sending, subscribing and receiving messages. OSIDs were programmatic interfaces which comprised a Service Oriented Architecture for designing and building reusable and interoperable software.

Each message had a Type and a Topic and what messages were received could be filtered by Type and Topic. Messages could be sent to a specific subset of subscribers (Agents) or to all subscribers. This OSID was a general service intended to interface with underlying email, chat, instant messaging, or threaded discussion systems.

References 
Software architecture